Fahlian-e Olya (also Romanized as Fahlīān-e ‘Olyá; also known as Fahleyān Bālā, Fahlīān, Fahlīān-e Bālā, Faleyūn-e Bozorg, and Fehliān) is a village in Fahlian Rural District, in the Central District of Mamasani County, Fars Province, Iran. At the 2006 census, its population was 1,178, in 282 families.

References 

Populated places in Mamasani County